Csaba Tóth (born 7 October 1967) is a Hungarian racing driver currently competing in the TCR International Series. Having previously competed in the FIA Central European Zone Circuit Championship.

Racing career
Tóth began his career in 2016 in the FIA Central European Zone Circuit Championship, taking several podiums during the season. The first podium came at the Autodrom Most in the second Sprint race. Followed by two more podiums at the Masaryk Circuit Sprint races.

In June 2017 it was announced that he would race in the TCR International Series, driving a SEAT León TCR for Zengő Motorsport.

Racing record

Complete TCR International Series results
(key) (Races in bold indicate pole position) (Races in italics indicate fastest lap)

† Driver did not finish the race, but was classified as he completed over 90% of the race distance.
* Season still in progress.

References

External links
 

1967 births
Living people
TCR International Series drivers
People from Nagykáta
Hungarian racing drivers
24H Series drivers
Sportspeople from Pest County
Zengő Motorsport drivers